Elliott Monfries (25 December 1873 – 2 September 1954) was an Australian cricketer. He played six first-class cricket matches for Victoria between 1903 and 1904.

See also
 List of Victoria first-class cricketers

References

External links
 

1873 births
1954 deaths
Australian cricketers
Victoria cricketers
Cricketers from Adelaide